The Summa de casibus poenitentiae (Summary Concerning the Cases of Penance) is a book written from 1224 to 1226 by Raymond of Penyafort. It is a guide for members of the Dominican Order when  hearing confessions. The work was later revised and annotated by William of Rennes between 1234 and 1245.

Composition

Penyafort's work relied heavily on Gratian's Decretum Gratiani. In it Penyafort put forth the argument that acting in defense of yourself or your property could only occur when an attack was already under way and you were repelling it, or if an attack was imminent. Accordingly, Penyafort put defending yourself and offensive actions in juxtaposition, as defense concerned the immediate future and the present, and offense was an act of vengeance for actions which had already been committed.

Summa de Matrimonio
Following up on poenitentiae, Raymond wrote a Summa de Matrimonio, about issues of marriage. This second work was often appended to the Summa de casibus poenitentiae and was also included together with it, as its fourth and final part, in the printed editio princeps in 1603.

References

Bibliography

External links
 Lewis E 248 Summa de casibus poenitentia, glossed at OPenn

13th-century illuminated manuscripts
Dominican Order
Penitentials
Raymond of Penyafort
1220s books